Miri or Mising, also known as Plains Miri, is a Tani language spoken by the Mising people. There are 629,954 speakers (as per Census of India, 2011), who inhabit mostly the Lakhimpur, Sonitpur, Dhemaji, Dibrugarh, Sibsagar, Jorhat, Majuli, Golaghat, Tinsukia districts of Assam and also some parts of Arunachal Pradesh. The primary literary body of Mising is known as 'Mising Agom Kébang (Mising Language Society)'.

The Mising, Padam and Minyong speak dialects of the same language.

Phonology

Consonants

Vowels

Geographical distribution

Ethnologue gives the following locations for Mising speakers. The Hill Miri live in Arunachal Pradesh, while the Plains Miri live in Assam.

Assam: North Lakhimpur, Sonitpur, Dhemaji, Dibrugarh, Sibsagar, Jorhat, Majuli,Charaideu,Bishwanath,Golaghat, and Tinsukia districts
Arunachal Pradesh
Districts of East Siang, Lower Dibang valley and Lohit. Also on both sides of Kamla river in Ziro subdivision, Lower Subansiri district
Daporizo subdivision, Upper Subansiri district

See also 
 Mising Autonomous Council
 Takam Mising Porin Kebang

References

External links
Mising Language course (Agom, Gomlam, Gompir etc.)
misingagomkebang.org Mising Agom Kebang (Mising Sahitya Sabha) website
macgov.in Mising Autonomous Council
wethemising.wordpress.com Article on Mising language
Mark Post, A documentation of the Upper Belt variety of Minyong (Adi), Arunachal Pradesh, North East India. Endangered Languages Archive.

Tani languages
Languages of Assam
Endangered languages of India
Languages of Arunachal Pradesh